Pablo Nassarre (or Nasarre; 1650–1730) was a Spanish priest, organist, and Baroque composer. His work, Escuela Música según la práctica moderna, made him an important theorist of the Baroque era.

Life
Nassarre was born blind in Alagón, Zaragoza, in 1650. He moved to Daroca to be taught by Pablo Bruna, also a blind composer. At age 22, Nassarre became a Franciscan and joined the Royal Convent of San Francisco in Zaragoza, where he was the organist until his death.

He also opened a school of harmony and counterpoint, where José de Torres and Joaquín Martínez de la Roca were his students.

Work

Writings
Escuela Música según la práctica moderna (1723 - 1724)
Fragmentos músicos (1683)

Surviving compositions
Arde en incendio de amor - A carol written in 1685.
Three toccatas for organ

Notes

References
Palacios, José Ignacio, Los compositores aragoneses, Zaragoza (2000) 
Enciclopedia universal ilustrada europeo-americana, Volume No. 1133

External links
Nassarre, fray Pablo in the Gran Enciclopedia Aragonesa
NASSARRE, Pablo in the Pequeña Enciclopedia Franciscana

1650 births
1730 deaths
People from Zaragoza
Spanish Baroque composers
Spanish male classical composers
Blind musicians
Spanish blind people
17th-century classical composers
18th-century classical composers
18th-century male musicians
18th-century keyboardists
17th-century male musicians